R v Mapara, 2005 1 S.C.R. 358,  2005 SCC 23, was a decision by the Supreme Court of Canada on criminal conspiracy.

See also
 List of Supreme Court of Canada cases (McLachlin Court)

External links
 

Supreme Court of Canada cases
2005 in Canadian case law
Canadian criminal case law
Conspiracy (criminal)